KJCP-TV was a television station in Pago Pago. The station broadcasts in the NTSC standard on UHF Channel 38. It was founded on November 4, 2003, to offer TBN and JCTV programming to the island, as WVUV-LP switched from TBN to NBC. It ceased transmissions in 2007 when its rented tower was dismantled.

See also
Communications in American Samoa

References

External links

JCP-LP
Trinity Broadcasting Network affiliates
Television channels and stations established in 2003
Defunct television stations in the United States
Television channels and stations disestablished in 2010
2003 establishments in American Samoa
2010 disestablishments in American Samoa
Defunct mass media in American Samoa
Religious television stations in the United States